Francis Holles, 2nd Baron Holles (1627–1690) was an English statesman, and only child of Denzil Holles, 1st Baron Holles (best known as one of the five members of parliament whom King Charles I of England attempted to arrest in 1642) and his first wife Dorothy, daughter and heiress of Sir Francis Ashley. Francis inherited the peerage of Baron Holles from his father.

Francis represented both the Wiltshire and Lostwithiel British parliamentary constituencies. Whilst sitting for the latter, he was excluded from the Pride's Purge, which took place in December 1648.

A sculpture of Francis by Nicholas Stone exists in Westminster Abbey.

References 

2
1627 births
1690 deaths
Members of the pre-1707 English Parliament for constituencies in Cornwall
English MPs 1640–1648
English MPs 1654–1655
Members of the Parliament of England for Dorchester